USS Sadie Ross (SP-736) was a United States Navy patrol vessel in commission from 1917 to 1920.

Sadie Ross was built in 1904 as a commercial tug of the same name by the Atlantic Works at East Boston, Massachusetts. On 17 May or 2 June 1917, the U.S. Navy acquired her from Rosstown Boat for use as a section patrol boat during World War I. She was commissioned as USS Sadie Ross (SP-736) on 7 June 1917.

Assigned to the 1st Naval District in northern New England, Sadie Ross performed patrol duty for the rest of World War I.

Sadie Ross was sold on 6 August 1920.

Notes

References

Department of the Navy Naval History and Heritage Command Online Library of Selected Images: Civilian Ships: Sadie Ross (American Harbor Tug, 1904). Served as USS Sadie Ross (SP-736) in 1917-1920
NavSource Online: Section Patrol Craft Photo Archive Sadie Ross (SP 736)

Patrol vessels of the United States Navy
World War I patrol vessels of the United States
Ships built in Boston
1904 ships